Playsets, or play sets, are themed collections of similar toys designed to work together to enact some action or event. The most common toy playsets involve plastic figures, accessories, and possibly buildings or scenery, purchased together in a common box. Some sets during the 1960s and 1970s were offered within metal "suitcase" containers that also functioned as part of the playset.

First pioneered by metal figure manufacturers around the turn of the 20th century, usually as military "play" figures with simple accessories, the concept of the playset was further developed by companies like Marx Toys, Superior Toy, Remco, Deluxe Reading, Multiple Toymakers (MPC) and others throughout the Baby Boomer era. Several manufacturers continue to produce playsets today.

Popular playsets

Several popular playsets by Marx were:

 Battle of the Blue and Gray (1958)
 Battleground
 Ben-Hur
 Desert Fox
 Fort Apache (1951)
 The Alamo
 The Guns of Navarone
 Johnny Tremain

Popular playsets based on television series were:

 The Adventures of Rin Tin Tin
 The Adventures of Robin Hood (TV series)
 Captain Gallant of the Foreign Legion
 Daniel Boone
 Davy Crockett
 The Flintstones
 The Gallant Men
 Tom Corbett
 Gunsmoke
 Jungle Jim later recycled as Daktari
 Johnny Ringo
 The Rifleman
 The Roy Rogers Show Mineral City (1952) (the first "branded" playset)
 The Untouchables
 Zorro

See also
 Toy soldiers
 Reamsa Plastic Toy soldier

References

 Levinthal, David Small Wonder: Worlds in a Box Zzdap Publishing (1997)
 Playsets at Marx Toy Museum

Further reading
 Playset Magazine

Action figures
Toy collecting
1950s toys
1960s toys
1970s toys